Vincent Grade/Acton station is a Metrolink rail station just north of the community of Acton, California. It is served by Metrolink's Antelope Valley Line from Los Angeles Union Station to Lancaster.

The station shelters are designed to resemble Wild West-era facades.

This station predominantly serves residents of southern and eastern Palmdale, due to the station's closer proximity to these areas than the Palmdale Transportation Center in northern Palmdale.

Connections 
The station is served by  Antelope Valley Transit Authority route 790, the North County TRANSporter. The route allows Metrolink passengers on mid-day trains (that only go as far as Newhall station in the Santa Clarita Valley) to travel to the Palmdale station. Vincent Grade/Acton station is only served in the northbound direction, by request from passengers onboard the bus.

See also 
 Lang Southern Pacific Station, a California Historic Landmark

References

External links 

Metrolink stations in Los Angeles County, California
Transportation in Palmdale, California
Railway stations in the United States opened in 1994